Cyrus Cama (born 6 November 1971) is an Indian sailor. He competed in the men's 470 event at the 1992 Summer Olympics.

References

External links
 

1971 births
Living people
Indian male sailors (sport)
Olympic sailors of India
Sailors at the 1992 Summer Olympics – 470
Place of birth missing (living people)
Sailors at the 1990 Asian Games
Medalists at the 1990 Asian Games
Asian Games bronze medalists for India
Asian Games medalists in sailing